Wivenhoe Park is a painting of an English landscape park, the estate of the Rebow family, by the English Romantic painter, John Constable (1776–1837).

John Constable was born in Suffolk, and is known principally for his landscape paintings, especially the landscapes of the countryside where he spent his childhood. His paintings are now considered among the most popular and valuable in British art.

Painting
The National Gallery of Art holds this painting as one of its highlights:A pleasant sense of ease and harmony pervades this landscape of almost photographic clarity. The large areas of brilliant sunshine and cool shade, the rambling line of the fence, and the beautiful balance of trees, meadow, and river are evidence of the artist's creative synthesis of the actual site.

The painting was commissioned by the owner of Wivenhoe Park, Major General Francis Slater-Rebow, who was among the artist's first patrons, being a close friend of the artist's father, Golding Constable. Slater-Rebow commissioned several paintings from Constable, including a portrait of the general's seven-year-old daughter in 1812. She also figures in this painting, in a donkey cart to the left. This painting, finished in September 1816, earned the artist enough money to allow him to marry his long-time love, Mary Bicknell. They married in October 1816.

Constable's art is always penetrated by longing, melancholy and a yearning for the simple, natural life, for a bucolic, pastoral idyll,  to rural subjects and aspects of life in the countryside, a "golden age" when people lived together in harmony with nature, a world on its way of disappearing when he painted his landscapes thanks to the beginning of the Industrial Revolution. He was aware of the issue of urban growth, of urban life's  unpleasantness, which he contrasted to life in the countryside. Constable's art was rather unconventional for his time, and he loved simple things, a natural landscape without the ruins, dramatic effects or exalted, often excessive feelings, like the ones displayed in the paintings of his contemporary, J. M. W. Turner. His landscapes are flooded by a silvery brilliant light in the water and air and in the sky, and are characterised by a special intensity that is such an important feature of this artist's works.

References
Citations

Bibliography

External links
 The painting in the permanent collection, National Gallery of Art
 John Constable, Romantic painter

Paintings by John Constable
1816 paintings
Collections of the National Gallery of Art
Landscape paintings
Birds in art
Cattle in art
Ships in art
England in art